Süderheistedt is a municipality in the district of Dithmarschen, in Schleswig-Holstein, Germany.

References

Municipalities in Schleswig-Holstein
Dithmarschen